Justo Galaviz (6 September 1954 – 21 September 2013) was a Venezuelan cyclist. He competed in the individual road race and team time trial events at the 1976 Summer Olympics.

References

External links
 

1954 births
2013 deaths
Venezuelan male cyclists
Olympic cyclists of Venezuela
Cyclists at the 1976 Summer Olympics
Place of birth missing
Pan American Games medalists in cycling
20th-century Venezuelan people
Pan American Games bronze medalists for Venezuela
Medalists at the 1983 Pan American Games